Background (U.S. Edge of Divorce) is a 1953 British domestic drama film dealing with the effects of divorce, directed by Daniel Birt and starring Valerie Hobson, Philip Friend and Norman Wooland.  It was based on the 1950 play of the same title by Warren Chetham-Strode, who also wrote the screenplay for the film. It was made at Southall Studios, with sets designed by the art director Michael Stringer.

A contemporary review in the Glasgow Herald gave the film a muted response, describing Hobson as "shrill" and Wooland as "too sympathetic", adding : " A heroic effort is made to apportion the blame fairly...yet intrinsically, one has to admit, the film has no great success."

Plot
John and Barbie Lomax (Friend and Hobson) have been married for almost 20 years, but the marriage has seemingly reached breaking point.  After leaving the army, John has been working hard on making a career for himself as a barrister, which takes up all of his time and attention, leaving him exhausted and irritable.  He acts intolerantly and dismissively towards Barbie and their three children, and the marital relationship comes under intolerable strain as the couple argue, bicker and snipe constantly at each other.  Realising that the poisoned atmosphere is not good for the children to experience, they agree that in the circumstances divorce is the lesser evil.

They are unprepared for how badly the children react when they break the news.  The children jump to the conclusion that family friend 'Uncle' Bill Ogden (Woolard) is to blame, assuming from what they have seen that he has designs on Barbie.  While this is true, it does not explain the depth of unhappiness felt by both their parents at their increasingly acrimonious relationship.

As the wheels of the divorce are set in motion, John and Barbie are faced with coming to agreement about what should happen to the children, whether all should be given to the custody of one parent, or whether they should be split up.  Caught in the middle, the children take matters into their own hands, forcing their parents to reassess the wisdom of the path they are about to take.  Finally they are forced into an about-face after realising the destructive effect of divorce on the children.  They decided they must stay together for the sake of the family resolving to put on a brave face and live at least partly a life of pretense. However, a final moment when they laugh together for the first time in years about the relief and reconciliation of their children suggests that love and understanding might return to the marriage after all.

Cast

 Valerie Hobson as Barbie Lomax
 Philip Friend as John Lomax
 Norman Wooland as Bill Ogden
 Janette Scott as Jess Lomax
 Mandy Miller as Linda Lomax
 Jeremy Spenser as Adrian Lomax
 Lily Kann as Brownie
 Helen Shingler as Mary Wallace

 Thora Hird as Mrs. Humphries
 Louise Hampton as Miss Russell
 Jack Melford as Mackay
 Richard Wattis as David Wallace
 Joss Ambler as Judge
 Lloyd Lamble Defence Counsel
 Barbara Hicks as Mrs. Young
 Ernest Butcher as Clerk

Production
It was an early writing credit for Don Sharp who became a noted director. Sharp had just written Child's Play for Group Three, produced by Herbert Mason. Group Three had bought the screenrights to the play Background by Warren Chetham-Strode and Mason was going to produce the film version. Sharp says Mason and Warren did not get on, so Sharp was brought on to do the screenplay in collaboration with Warren. Sharp also worked on the film as an assistant to Mason.

References

External links 
 
Film review at New York Times
Film review at Variety
 Background at BFI Film & TV Database
 

1953 films
1953 drama films
British black-and-white films
British drama films
Films directed by Daniel Birt
British films based on plays
Films produced by Herbert Mason
Films set in London
Films about divorce
Films shot at Southall Studios
1950s English-language films
1950s British films